Gulfam Khan is an Indian television and film actress who works in Indian television and Bollywood Hindi cinema. She is known for playing the role of Nazneen in Aladdin - Naam Toh Suna Hoga from 2018 to 2020.

Early life 
Gulfam is known in the industry as a Tech Junkie, and she is also fond of painting.

Career 
Khan made her acting debut in 2003, as Guddi, in the TV Series Lipstick. She has worked under well-known banners of the Mumbai Film Industry and with several producers and directors, for several television serials and movies (Ref the following section "Filmography"). She has recently been cast in Amir-Khan Starrer movie Talaash. In addition to her on-screen contribution, Gulfam Khan started writing screenplays in 2007. Gulfam has co-written some movie screenplays including Hisss with Jennifer Lynch. Gulfam has also written Comedy Circus Season-1 for Sony Entertainment Television (India). Gulfam has just completed working in Nagesh Kukunoors next movie Laxmi by National Award-winning director Nagesh Kukunoor, which has recently been sent for nominations to various film festivals. In June 2013. Gulfam wrapped up an episodic show called Savdhan India on Life OK Channel.

Gulfam is currently looking to diversify her casting profile. After playing brothel owner Rasili Bai in Ghar Ki Lakshmi... Betiyann, a madame in the movie Talaash and a slum queen — a boss of all bad deeds — in Mann Mein Hai Vishwas, she has turned down two films and one soap, Bani — Ishq Da Kalma, which required her to repeat the role. She has received several appreciations from the industry for her various contributions in television and cinema.

Filmography

Television

Films

References

External links 
 

Indian television actresses
Indian film actresses
Living people
Year of birth missing (living people)
Actresses from Mumbai
Indian voice actresses
Actresses in Hindi cinema
Indian people of Pashtun descent
University of Mumbai alumni